Fontenay can refer to:

Persons
Charles L. Fontenay, journalist and science-fiction writer
Jean-Baptiste Belin de Fontenay I, French painter
Odette Le Fontenay (1885-1965), French singer

Battles
 Battle of Fontenay (841), during the Carolingian civil war
 Battle of Fontenay-le-Comte, in 1793, during the War in the Vendée

Fontenai and Fontenay is the name or part of the name of several communes in France:

Fontenay, Eure, in the department of Eure
Fontenay, Indre, in the department of Indre
Fontenay, Manche, in the department of Manche
Fontenay, Saône-et-Loire, in the department of Saône-et-Loire
Fontenay, Seine-Maritime, in the department of Seine-Maritime
Fontenay, Vosges, in the department of Vosges
Fontenai-les-Louvets, in the department of Orne
Fontenai-sur-Orne, in the department of Orne
Fontenay-aux-Roses, in the department of Hauts-de-Seine
Fontenay-de-Bossery, in the department of Aube
Fontenay-en-Parisis, in the department of Val-d'Oise
Fontenay-le-Comte, in the department of Vendée
Fontenay-le-Fleury, in the department of Yvelines
Fontenay-le-Marmion, in the department of Calvados
Fontenay-le-Pesnel, in the department of Calvados
Fontenay-lès-Briis, in the department of Essonne
Fontenay-le-Vicomte, in the department of Essonne
Fontenay-Mauvoisin, in the department of Yvelines
Fontenay-près-Chablis, in the department of Yonne
Fontenay-près-Vézelay, in the department of Yonne
Fontenay-Saint-Père, in the department of Yvelines
Fontenay-sous-Bois, in the department of Val-de-Marne
Fontenay-sous-Fouronnes, in the department of Yonne
Fontenay-sur-Conie, in the department of Eure-et-Loir
Fontenay-sur-Eure, in the department of Eure-et-Loir
Fontenay-sur-Loing, in the department of Loiret
Fontenay-sur-Mer, in the department of Manche
Fontenay-sur-Vègre, in the department of Sarthe
Fontenay-Torcy, in the department of Oise
Fontenay-Trésigny, in the department of Seine-et-Marne

Other
Abbey of Fontenay, in Burgundy, France
 Côte de Fontenay, a Premier cru vineyard in Chablis
The Fontenay, a luxury hotel in Hamburg, Germany, opened in March 2018

See also
 Fontenoy (disambiguation)